Enka or ENKA may refer to:

Enka, a song form popular in Japan
Enka Insaat ve Sanayi A.S., a Turkish construction conglomerate
Enka, North Carolina, a town in North Carolina
Enka BV, a former Dutch company, now Akzo Nobel
ENKA Schools, a private school in Istanbul, Turkey

See also
 Encke (disambiguation)